Karata may refer to:
Karata people, a people of the Caucasus in Dagestan, Russia
Karata language, the Avar-Andic language spoken by the Karata people
Karata (rural locality), a rural locality (a selo) in Akhvakhsky District of the Republic of Dagestan, Russia

See also
 Karatas (disambiguation)